Bus is a 1980 satirical play by Bulgarian playwright Stanislav Stratiev. It premiered at Sofia's Satirical Theatre om March 29, 1980. In 2007, the play was presented at the festival in Avignon, France in the French title of L' Autobus.

Plot
Nine people are traveling on a public bus to the city center, but the bus suddenly deviates from its route. Passengers begin to realize that they will never get to where they are going. Fear, panic and terror turn them into transparent humanoid mass. The play then deals with questions facing humanity as they face their impending doom.

References

1980 plays
Bulgarian plays
Satirical plays